Francisco J. Serrano y Alvarez de la Rosa (March 12, 1900 in Mexico City – December 3, 1982 in Mexico City) was a Mexican civil engineer and architect.

Serrano studied civil engineering and afterwards architecture at the Universidad Nacional Autónoma de México (UNAM), where later taught as professor of civil engineering and architecture, and researched influences of climatic phenomenons on architecture. His son J. Francisco Serrano Cacho became also a notable architect.

Works

Buildings in Colonia Hipódromo, Condesa, Mexico City
Edificio Basurto (1942-1945),
Edificio México (1932)
 Laredo 5 (1933)
 Laredo 22 (1942, 1971, 1985)
Nuevo León 68 (1952)
Cine Auditorio Plaza (with Fernando Pineda), (corner of Nuevo León, Tamaulipas, and Juan Escutia)
 Edificio Confort
Edificio ACRO (1937), corner of Insurgentes and Quintana Roo
Edificio Insurgentes or Glorieta (1938), corner of Insurgentes and Chilpancingo
Chilpancingo 39
Edificio "Casas Jardínes" (1928-1930), Amsterdam 285 corner of Sonora

Other buildings

 Edificio Royalty (1936)
 Pasaje Polanco, originally called Pasaje Comercial, Polanco
 Faculty of Engineering (UNAM) at the Ciudad Universitaria (UNAM "University City"), Mexico City (collaboration with Fernando Pineda and Luis MacGregor Krieger), 1953
Edificio Centro Olímpico/Former Aeroméxico Headquarters Building (1967-8, together with Luis MacGregor Krieger and Fernando Pineda), razed 2018, Paseo de la Reforma 445, Mexico City
 Cine Teresa (1942), Eje Central Lázaro Cárdenas

References 

Mexican civil engineers
Modernist architects from Mexico
1900 births
1982 deaths
Architects from Mexico City
Condesa
National Autonomous University of Mexico alumni
Academic staff of the National Autonomous University of Mexico
20th-century Mexican architects